Andrey Favorsky (4 January 1929 – 13 May 2005) was a Soviet equestrian. He competed at the 1956 Summer Olympics, the 1960 Summer Olympics and the 1964 Summer Olympics.

References

External links
 

1929 births
2005 deaths
Soviet male equestrians
Olympic equestrians of the Soviet Union
Equestrians at the 1956 Summer Olympics
Equestrians at the 1960 Summer Olympics
Equestrians at the 1964 Summer Olympics
Place of birth missing